Lasha, meaning fissure is a place apparently east of the Dead Sea. It was later known as Callirrhoe, a place famous for its hot springs.

References

Hebrew Bible places